BIRT may refer to:

 Brain Injury Rehabilitation Trust, a provider of specialist brain injury rehabilitation in the UK
 BIRT Project (Business Intelligence and Reporting Tools), an open source software project
 BIRT, stock ticker symbol for Actuate Corporation
 Be it resolved that, a phrase that frequently begins an operative paragraph of a resolution

See also
 Birt (disambiguation)